Krzyżanowice Duze is a settlement in Pińczów village in Pińczów commune in Pińczów poviat in Świętokrzyskie Voivodship, in the south-central part of the Pińczów commune.

References

Villages in Pińczów County